Loren Lloyd Roberts (born June 24, 1955) is an American professional golfer, who has played on the PGA Tour and the PGA Tour Champions.

Early life
Roberts was born in San Luis Obispo, California. He competed for San Luis Obispo Senior High School and California Polytechnic State University.  In 1975, he turned professional after his sophomore season due to the university's dropping its NCAA Division II golf team.

Professional career
In the late 1970s, Roberts worked for Dennis Pogue as an assistant pro at San Luis Obispo Golf and Country Club as well as Morro Bay Golf Course. He won the Foot-Joy PGA Assistant Professional Championship of 1979 and was second in 1980. The first professional tour where he briefly competed was the PGA Tour of Australasia, after his 1979 PGA victory.

On his fifth attempt, Roberts earned his PGA Tour card at the PGA Tour Qualification Tournament in 1980 for the 1981 season. He returned to the tournament in 1981, 1982, 1986 and 1987, earning his card every year except 1981. He did not get his first win on the PGA Tour until 1994 at age 38, yet it sparked a nine-season run of eight victories. His career earnings are over $15 million.  He is known as "Boss of the Moss" for his putting skills. He has featured in the top 20 of the Official World Golf Rankings.

Roberts' best finish in a major was tie for 2nd place at the 1994 U.S. Open. He contended in an 18-hole playoff with Ernie Els and Colin Montgomerie. Montgomerie was eliminated.  An additional pair of sudden-death holes gave Els the title.

Roberts played for the United States in the 1995 Ryder Cup, 1994 and 2000 Presidents Cups, and 2001 UBS Warburg Cup. He was 3–1 at the Ryder Cup, 4-2-1 at the Presidents Cups, and 1–2 at the UBS Warburg Cup.  Of the four team events, only the Ryder Cup team lost. He was a co-assistant captain for the 2006 Ryder Cup which was also defeated by the European team.

After concentrating on the Champions Tour in 2006, Roberts went without a PGA Tour card for the 2007 and 2008 seasons, passing on using his exemption for being among the top 50 in career earnings. He used the exemption for the 2009 season.

Senior career
In 2005, Roberts joined the Champions Tour. His first senior win came in his third event at the JELD-WEN Tradition, one of five senior majors. He defeated Dana Quigley in a two-hole sudden-death playoff.

In 2006, Roberts became the first golfer to open a Champions Tour season with three wins. Later that season he won his second senior major by beating Eduardo Romero in a playoff at the Senior British Open. He won the Byron Nelson Award for lowest average stroke total per round.

In 2009, he won his second Senior British Open title after beating Fred Funk and Mark McNulty in a playoff. He won a month later in August at the Boeing Classic, where he denied Mark O'Meara his first Champions Tour victory, defeating him by one stroke after making birdie on the final hole. The GWAA voted him Player of the Year.

He broke 54-hole tournament record for lowest score in relationship to par (25-under) and most birdies (26) as well as sharing lowest score (191). The marks were set largely due to scoring a career-best 61 in the final round of his 2006 MasterCard Championship at Hualalai win.

Other achievements
Roberts hosts the annual Loren Roberts Celebrity Pro-Am in May at Spring Creek Ranch in Collierville, Tennessee. Its first year was 1995. The benefitting charity is Le Bonheur Children's Medical Center of Memphis, Tennessee.

Roberts was named Professional co-Athlete of the Year by the Tennessee Sports Hall of Fame in 1995 and 2007.  He was inducted into the Cal Poly-SLO Athletics Hall of Fame in 1998. The Tennessee Golf Foundation inducted him into the Tennessee Golf Hall of Fame in 2006. He has been a resident of Germantown, Tennessee, since the 1980s.

Roberts wrote Focus:  The Name of the Game with fellow PGA Tour golfers Scott Simpson and Larry Mize.  The 128-page book was published by J. Countryman in 1999.

Professional wins (25)

PGA Tour wins (8)

PGA Tour playoff record (2–1)

Other wins (5)
This list may be incomplete.
1979 Foot-Joy PGA Assistant Professional Championship
1992 Ben Hogan Pebble Beach Invitational
1997 Callaway Golf Pebble Beach Invitational
1999 Tennessee Open
2010 Straight Down Fall Classic (with Michael Rowley)

Champions Tour wins (13)

Champions Tour playoff record (3–2)

Results in major championships

CUT = missed the halfway cut
WD = withdrew
"T" indicates a tie for a place

Summary

Most consecutive cuts made – 9 (1991 U.S. Open – 1995 Masters)
Longest streak of top-10s – 3 (2000 Masters – 2000 Open Championship)

Results in The Players Championship

CUT = missed the halfway cut
"T" indicates a tie for a place

Results in World Golf Championships

1Cancelled due to 9/11

QF, R16, R32, R64 = Round in which player lost in match play
"T" = Tied
NT = No tournament

Senior major championships

Wins (4)

Results timeline
Results not in chronological order before 2017.

CUT = missed the halfway cut
WD = withdrew
"T" indicates a tie for a place
NT = No tournament due to COVID-19 pandemic

U.S. national team appearances
This list may be incomplete.

Professional
Ryder Cup: 1995
Presidents Cup: 1994 (winners), 2000 (winners)
UBS Warburg Cup: 2001 (winners)

See also
Fall 1980 PGA Tour Qualifying School graduates
1982 PGA Tour Qualifying School graduates
1983 PGA Tour Qualifying School graduates
1986 PGA Tour Qualifying School graduates
1987 PGA Tour Qualifying School graduates
List of golfers with most Champions Tour major championship wins
List of golfers with most Champions Tour wins

References

External links

Tournament press conferences

American male golfers
PGA Tour golfers
PGA Tour Champions golfers
Ryder Cup competitors for the United States
Winners of senior major golf championships
Golfers from California
Golfers from Tennessee
People from San Luis Obispo, California
People from Germantown, Tennessee
1955 births
Living people